Otto IV of Bergau (1399 - 1452), also known as Otto the Younger of Bergau, was a Bohemian nobleman and anti-Hussite leader.

Biography
Otto was born in 1399 to Otto III of Bergau and Markéta of Žlunice. He inherited parts of his father's estate including Trosky Castle and Chlumec nad Cidlinou. He is said to have hidden the treasure in Trosky Castle, supposedly in an underground cellar blocked by a huge boulder.

It was then likely given to Hynek Boček of Poděbrady. Otto and his son, John, reclaimed Chlumec shortly thereafter.

References

1399 births
1452 deaths
15th-century Bohemian people
Medieval Bohemian nobility